The 2016 Kansas–Missouri murder spree was a March 2016 American mass shooting in which four men were shot in a killing spree in Kansas and another was shot, shortly afterward, in Missouri.

Background 
On the night of March 7, 2016, four men were shot to death with a shotgun in Kansas City, Kansas. One of them managed to call police about the shooting before dying. A truck believed to have been driven by the suspect was found five miles away along Interstate 70, and a massive manhunt for him was launched. Two police helicopters and at least one SWAT team were involved in the search.

Arrest and legal proceedings 

On March 9, police in New Florence, Missouri, responded to reports of a man pulling a firearm on a civilian at a gas station. At 12:18 a.m., suspect Pablo Antonio Serrano-Vitorino, 40, who lived next door to the four initial victims, was found at a muddy hill alongside Interstate 70 and arrested by Missouri State Highway Patrol Sergeants Primm and McGinnis. No shots were fired despite him being armed. He was armed with a Kalashnikov rifle at the time of his arrest.  He was charged with four counts of first-degree murder in Kansas and was jailed in Montgomery County, Missouri, with bail set at $2 million. The day following the arrest, he attempted suicide by cutting himself with a safety razor. He was admitted to a local hospital and was classified to be in stable condition.

On June 1, Serrano-Vitorino pleaded not guilty to the Missouri killing. The death penalty was sought in that case. In September, his Missouri case was transferred by a Montgomery County judge to St. Louis, Missouri for trial. He had previously been sentenced to two years in a California prison for making a terrorist threat and had subsequently been deported from the U.S. in April 2004, but had reentered illegally again at an unspecified time.

On April 9, 2019, Serrano-Vitorino was found alone and unresponsive in his cell, having hanged himself. He was taken to a hospital where he later was pronounced dead.

Victims 
Kansas:
 Jeremy Waters, 36
 Michael Capps, 41
 Clint Harter, 27
 Austin Harter, 29

Missouri:
 Randy Nordman, 49

References

External links
 Suspect in 5 murders in Kansas and Missouri caught, CBS News

2016 active shooter incidents in the United States
2016 in Kansas
2016 in Missouri
2016 mass shootings in the United States
2016 murders in the United States
Mass shootings in the United States
Deaths by firearm in Kansas
Deaths by firearm in Missouri
Mass murder in 2016
Mass shootings in Kansas
Spree shootings in the United States
Crime in Kansas
Crime in Missouri
March 2016 crimes in the United States